When I Walk is a 2013 autobiographical documentary film directed by Jason DaSilva. The film follows DaSilva during the seven years following his diagnosis of primary progressive multiple sclerosis. When I Walk premiered at the 2013 Sundance Film Festival, won Best Canadian Feature Documentary at the 2013 HotDocs Film Festival, and won an Emmy for the News & Documentary Emmy Award.

Content

In 2006, 25-year-old established film-maker Jason DaSilva collapsed on a beach while on holiday, months after his diagnosis for multiple sclerosis. Realizing that his condition could no longer be ignored, he decided to produce a documentary. The film focuses on the changes in his relationships with his mother and partner as his condition develops.

DaSilva's story has since been expanded with a 2019 documentary sequel entitled When We Walk.

Reception

Critical response 

When I Walk was positively received by critics. The film was named a Critic's Pick by The New York Times and Village Voice. On review aggregator Rotten Tomatoes, the film holds an approval rating of 88% based on 17 reviews, with an average rating of 7.76/10.

Awards 

 News & Documentary Emmy Award 2015 - Outstanding Informational Programming
 Best Canadian Feature - Hot Docs 2013
 Audience Award - Vancouver International Film Festival 2013
 Grand Jury Prize - Los Angeles Asian Pacific Film Festival 2013
 Best Canadian Documentary and Audience Award - Global Visions Film Festival 2014 
 Social Justice Award - San Diego Asian Film Festival 2013

References

External links
 

Documentary films about people with disability
2013 documentary films
2013 films
Autobiographical documentary films
Films about multiple sclerosis
Films scored by Jeff Beal
POV (TV series) films
American documentary films
Canadian documentary films
2010s English-language films
2010s Canadian films
2010s American films